Erebus and Terror Gulf is a gulf on the southeast side of the tip of the Antarctic Peninsula, bordered on the northeast by the Joinville Island group and on the southwest by the James Ross Island group. It was named for HMS Erebus and HMS Terror, the vessels used by Sir James Clark Ross in exploring these waters in 1842–43

This region contains tabular icebergs.

See also
Barker Bank

References 

Bays of the James Ross Island group
Landforms of the Joinville Island group